Giovanni Tomi (born 31 December 1987) is an Italian footballer who currently plays as a defender for Prato.

References

External links
 
 

1987 births
Footballers from Naples
Living people
Italian footballers
Association football defenders
U.S. Catanzaro 1929 players
Calcio Foggia 1920 players
Ascoli Calcio 1898 F.C. players
U.S. Lecce players
F.C. Pavia players
Rimini F.C. 1912 players
A.S. Martina Franca 1947 players
Matera Calcio players
A.C. Prato players
A.S. Sambenedettese players
Serie B players
Serie C players
Serie D players